The UAB Blazers women's basketball team represents the University of Alabama at Birmingham in women's basketball. The school competes in Conference USA in Division I of the National Collegiate Athletic Association (NCAA). The Blazers play home basketball games at Bartow Arena in Birmingham, Alabama.

History
The Blazers have an all-time record of 575–539 as of the end of the 2015–16 season. They played in the Sun Belt Conference from 1984 to 1991 and in the Great Midwest Conference from 1991 to 1995 before settling into Conference USA in 1995. They reached the Sweet Sixteen in 2000, the farthest a Conference USA team has reached in the NCAA Tournament. They won the 2011 Women's Basketball Invitational.

Postseason

NCAA Division I women's basketball tournament
The Blazers have appeared in the NCAA Division I women's basketball tournament twice. They have a record of 2-2.

References

External links